The Alexander Valley (Wappo: Unutsawaholmanoma, "Toyon Bush Berry Place") is a Californian American Viticultural Area (AVA) just north of Healdsburg in Sonoma County. It is home to many wineries and vineyards, as well as the city of Cloverdale. It is the largest and most fully planted wine region in Sonoma. Highway 101 runs through the valley, and the Russian River flows down the valley, surrounded by vineyards on both sides. From the higher elevations of the valley rim, there is a view as far south as Taylor Mountain and Sonoma Mountain. The region was named for Cyrus Alexander, owner of a part of the Rancho Sotoyome Mexican land grant, in 1847. Granted AVA status in 1984, the boundaries of the appellation are defined in the Code of Federal Regulations, Title 27, Section 9.53.

History

In its early history, the territory commonly referred to as the "Alexander Valley" denoted the benchlands east of the Russian River leading up to the Mayacamas Mountains. The area west of the Russian River was known as “the plaines” or “the ranchos.” Prior to Spanish colonization, Alexander Valley was occupied by the Wappo and Pomo. Viticulture in the area dates back to 1843, when Cyrus Alexander used vine cuttings collected from  Fort Ross on the Pacific coast, to establish vineyards in the area.  For most of its history the region was predominately associated with mass-produced bulk and jug wines made from indiscriminately planted field blends of red grape varieties. A modern era of quality wine production began in the late 1960s when a new owner of Simi Winery sought to revive the area's long winemaking history. In the 1970s, a new wave of producers, such as Chateau Souverain and Jordan Vineyard & Winery, descended upon the area and started making wines that received critical and consumer acclaim. Wine pioneer, Rodney Strong, whose namesake winery is located in Russian River Valley, was also among the first to recognize Alexander Valley's potential, producing and releasing Sonoma County's first single vineyard Cabernet Sauvignon from the 1974 vintage. The vineyard designated was Strong's Alexander's Crown vineyard located near Jimtown. In 1988, E & J Gallo Winery purchased substantial tracts of land in the Alexander Valley to establish the fine wine brand of the company.

In 1963, one of Alexander Valley's most prestigious vineyards, the Robert Young Vineyard, was planted. There were few wineries in the area at the time so the vineyard sourced most of it fruit to wineries outside the valley. One of these wineries, Chateau St. Jean, was so impressed with the quality of fruit that with the 1975 vintage of their Chardonnay they put the name of the vineyard on the wine label. This "vineyard designated wine" would be one of the first premium wines in California wine history to have the name of the vineyard appear on the label.

Expansion
Located in the northeastern section of Sonoma County, the original boundaries of the AVA extend from the banks of the Russian River eastward to the foothills of the Mayacamas Mountains. In 1986 these boundaries were expanded to include overlapping regions of the Russian River AVA. A second expansion occurred in 1990 to cover vineyards owned by Sir Peter Michael and Ellis Alden in the foothills east of Geyserville. In 2001, the area consisting of the Gill Creek watershed was changed from being part of the Dry Creek AVA to a reclassification as part of the Alexander Valley AVA.

Geography and climate

The Alexander Valley covers a broad expanse of land east of the Russian River consisting of the watershed that runs southeast from the Mendocino County line down to the boundaries of the Chalk Hill AVA. The area is sheltered from the influence of the nearby Pacific Oceans by the low-lying hills northeast of Healdsburg. The dominant vineyard soil of the region is alluvial. During the day, the Alexander Valley is one of the warmest areas in Northern California but at night experiences a wide diurnal temperature variation that offers cool climate conditions. The region's proximity to the Russian River serves a source for early morning fog that covers the lower vineyard areas until it is burned off by the morning sun.

Wines

A characteristic associated with Alexander Valley wines is a rich, fleshy mouthfeel and a degree of voluptuousness due to the area's generally warm climate and ability to sufficiently ripen the grapes. While the wine exhibit a degree of drinkability and accessibility in their youth, they may not have the same aging potential as wines from Napa Valley or even other areas of Sonoma County. The Alexander Valley is capable of growing a wide range of grape varieties but in recent years, the area has been noted for the quality of its Cabernet Sauvignon and Merlot. The alluvial soils of the region tend to impart a rich, chocolate note to the Cabernet. Other Alexander Valley varietals that have been gaining recognition include Chardonnay, Nebbiolo and Sangiovese. The Chardonnay from this region is characterized by its rich, tropical fruits. Some experts, such as Jancis Robinson, have speculated that Zinfandel and Sauvignon blanc may eventually prove themselves to be best suited to the climate and soils of the Alexander Valley.

River Rock Casino controversy
In the early 21st century, there was controversy when the Alexander Valley Association of farmers, wineries and property owners objected to a proposal for a tribal casino on land owned by the Pomo people. In 1998, the association had been able to block a large winery expansion proposed by Kendall-Jackson, but in the dispute with the Pomo casino, federal and state laws granted the tribe the right to develop the land in any way they wished. The casino was built and named River Rock Casino. Resulting traffic problems along Highway 128 after the casino's opening in 2002 led to public safety concerns during harvest season because of the agricultural traffic on the roads. These concerns intensified after River Rock received a liquor license in 2008.

References

External links
 Alexander Valley Winegrowers
 Sonoma County Winegrape Commission appellation maps
 

American Viticultural Areas
American Viticultural Areas of California
American Viticultural Areas of the San Francisco Bay Area
Geography of Sonoma County, California
1984 establishments in California